Atanycolus is a genus of braconid wasps.

Species 
 Atanycolus anocomidis
 Atanycolus arcasuturalis
 Atanycolus australiensis
 Atanycolus bambalio
 Atanycolus bignelli
 Atanycolus calophrys
 Atanycolus charus
 Atanycolus clypealis
 Atanycolus comosifrons
 Atanycolus crassicruris
 Atanycolus crenulatus
 Atanycolus cryptaspis
 Atanycolus denigrator
 Atanycolus dichrous
 Atanycolus disputabilis
 Atanycolus fahringeri
 Atanycolus femoratae
 Atanycolus fulviceps
 Atanycolus fulvus
 Atanycolus fuscipennis
 Atanycolus fuscorbitalis
 Atanycolus genalis
 Atanycolus hicoriae
 Atanycolus hookeri
 Atanycolus impressifrons
 Atanycolus impressus
 Atanycolus initiator
 Atanycolus ivanowi
 Atanycolus latabdominalis
 Atanycolus lindemani
 Atanycolus lineola
 Atanycolus lissogastrus
 Atanycolus longicauda
 Atanycolus longifemoralis
 Atanycolus malii
 Atanycolus megophthalmus
 Atanycolus melanophili
 Atanycolus microcellus
 Atanycolus microstigmatus
 Atanycolus montivagus
 Atanycolus neesii
 Atanycolus nigriventris
 Atanycolus nigropyga
 Atanycolus niteofrons
 Atanycolus obliquus
 Atanycolus octocolae
 Atanycolus parvacavus
 Atanycolus peruvianus
 Atanycolus petiolaris
 Atanycolus phaeostethus
 Atanycolus picipes
 Atanycolus pilosiventris
 Atanycolus rugosiventris
 Atanycolus simplex
 Atanycolus tranquebaricae
 Atanycolus triangulifer
 Atanycolus trichiura
 Atanycolus tunetensis
 Atanycolus ulmicola

References

Braconidae genera